Philip John Noel-Baker, Baron Noel-Baker,  (1 November 1889 – 8 October 1982), born Philip John Baker, was a British politician, diplomat, academic, athlete, and renowned campaigner for disarmament.  He carried the British team flag and won a silver medal for the 1500m at the 1920 Summer Olympics in Antwerp, and received the Nobel Peace Prize in 1959.

Noel-Baker is the only person to have won an Olympic medal and received a Nobel Prize. He was a Labour Member of Parliament (UK) for 36 years, serving from 1929 to 1931 and again from 1936 to 1970, serving in several ministerial offices and the cabinet. He became a life peer in 1977.

Early life and athletic career
Baker was born in Brondesbury Park, London, the sixth of seven children of the Canadian-born Quaker, Joseph Allen Baker and the Scottish-born Elizabeth Balmer Moscrip. His father had moved to England in 1876 to establish a manufacturing business and served as a Progressive member of the London County Council from 1895 to 1906 and as a Liberal member of the House of Commons for East Finsbury from 1905 to 1918.

Baker was educated at Ackworth School, Bootham School, and then in the US at the Quaker-associated Haverford College in Pennsylvania. He studied at King's College, Cambridge, from 1908 to 1912. As well as being an excellent student, obtaining a second in Part I history and a first in Part II economics, he was President of the Cambridge Union Society in 1912 and President of the Cambridge University Athletic Club from 1910 to 1912.

He was a competitor in the Olympic Games as a middle-distance runner, both before and after the First World War, representing Great Britain in the 800 metres and 1500 metres at the 1912 Olympic Games in Stockholm. He reached the final of the 1500 metres, won by his fellow countryman Arnold Jackson. At the 1920 Summer Olympics in Antwerp Baker was captain of the British track team and carried the team's flag. He won his first race in the 800 metres, but then concentrated on the 1500 metres, taking the silver medal behind his teammate Albert Hill. He was captain again at the 1924 Summer Olympics in Paris, but did not compete.

Baker's early career was as an academic. In 1914 he was appointed as vice-principal of Ruskin College, Oxford, and in 1915 was elected a fellow at King's College, Cambridge. During World War I, he organised and led the Friends' Ambulance Unit attached to the fighting front in France (1914–1915), and was then, as a conscientious objector from 1916, adjutant of the First British Ambulance Unit for Italy, in association with the British Red Cross (1915–1918), for which he received military medals from the UK, France and Italy.

Political career
After World War I, Noel-Baker was closely involved in the formation of the League of Nations, serving as assistant to Lord Robert Cecil, then assistant to Sir Eric Drummond, the league's first secretary-general. According to historian Susan Pedersen "Baker was far to the left of Drummond politically, but he had the kind of formation, connections, and intimate understanding of British officialdom’s rules of the game that made for easy collaboration between the two." Noel-Baker did much of the League's early work on the mandates system.

He became the first Sir Ernest Cassel Professor of International Relations at the University of London from 1924 to 1929 and a lecturer at Yale University from 1933 to 1934. His political career with the Labour Party began in 1924 when he stood, unsuccessfully, for Parliament in the Conservative safe seat of Birmingham Handsworth. He was elected as the member for Coventry in 1929, and served as parliamentary private secretary to the Foreign Secretary Arthur Henderson.

Noel-Baker lost his seat in 1931, but remained Henderson's assistant while Henderson was president of the World Disarmament Conference in Geneva in 1932 to 1933. He stood for Parliament again in Coventry in 1935, unsuccessfully, but won the Derby by-election in July 1936 after the sitting Derby Member of Parliament J. H. Thomas resigned. When that constituency was split in 1950, he transferred to Derby South.

Noel-Baker became a member of the Labour Party's National Executive Committee in 1937. On 21 June 1938, Noel-Baker, as M.P. for Derby, in the run up to World War II, spoke at the House of Commons against aerial bombing of German cities based on moral grounds. "The only way to prevent atrocities from the air is to abolish air warfare and national air forces altogether."

In the coalition government during the World War II he was a parliamentary secretary at the Ministry of War Transport from February 1942, and served as Minister of State for Foreign Affairs after Labour gained power following the 1945 general election, but had a poor relationship with the Foreign Secretary, Ernest Bevin. Noel-Baker moved to become Secretary of State for Air in October 1946, and then became Secretary of State for Commonwealth Relations in 1947 and joined the cabinet.

Noel-Baker was the minister responsible for organising the 1948 Olympic Games in London. He moved to the Ministry of Fuel and Power in 1950. In the mid-1940s, Noel-Baker served on the British delegation to what became the United Nations, helping to draft its charter and other rules for operation as a British delegate. He served as Chairman of the Labour Party in 1946–47, but lost his place on the National Executive Committee in 1948, his place being taken by Michael Foot. An opponent of left-wing Bevanite policies in the 1950s, and an advocate of multilateral nuclear disarmament, rather than a policy of unilateral disarmament, he received the Nobel Peace Prize in 1959. In 1979, with Fenner Brockway, he co-founded the World Disarmament Campaign, serving as co-Chair until he died, and was an active supporter of disarmament into the 1980s.

Noel-Baker stood down as the MP for Derby South at the 1970 general election, at which he was succeeded by Walter Johnson. His life peerage was announced in the 1977 Silver Jubilee and Birthday Honours and, aged 87, he was raised to the peerage 22 July 1977, as Baron Noel-Baker, of the City of Derby, having declined an appointment as a Companion of Honour in the 1965 New Year Honours. He was president of the International Council of Sport Science and Physical Education from 1960 to 1976. Noel-Baker was an active contributor to House of Lords debates into his nineties, speaking in debates on the ongoing Falklands War in the months preceding his death.

A memorial garden, the Philip Noel-Baker Peace Garden, exists within Elthorne Park, a small park in the London Borough of Islington.

Personal life
In June 1915, Philip John Baker married Irene Noel, a field hospital nurse in East Grinstead, subsequently adopting the hyphenated name Noel-Baker in 1921 by deed poll. His wife was a friend of Virginia Woolf. Their only son, Francis, also became a Labour MP and served together with his father in the Commons. Their marriage, however was not a success and Noel-Baker's mistress from 1936 was Megan Lloyd George, daughter of the former Liberal Party leader David Lloyd George, herself a Liberal and later Labour MP. The relationship ended when Irene died in 1956.

He died at home in Westminster on 8 October 1982.

Works

Writings
 (Reprint 1970, New York: Kennicat Press)

 
 (Reprint 1972, New York: Dover Publications)

By Philip Noel-Baker with other authors

See also
 Fridtjof Nansen
 List of peace activists

References

Bibliography
Primary and Secondary Sources

 Lloyd, Lorna: Philip Noel-Baker and the Peace Through Law in

External links

 
 
 
  (timeline of Noel-Baker's life, and index to his papers held at Churchill Archives Centre, Churchill College, Cambridge)
 

1889 births
1982 deaths
People from Hendon
Athletes from London
English Quakers
Labour Party (UK) MPs for English constituencies
Labour Party (UK) life peers
British sportsperson-politicians
English male middle-distance runners
Olympic athletes of Great Britain
Olympic silver medallists for Great Britain
Athletes (track and field) at the 1912 Summer Olympics
Athletes (track and field) at the 1920 Summer Olympics
Athletes (track and field) at the 1924 Summer Olympics
Members of the Parliament of the United Kingdom for constituencies in Derbyshire
UK MPs 1929–1931
UK MPs 1935–1945
UK MPs 1945–1950
UK MPs 1950–1951
UK MPs 1951–1955
UK MPs 1955–1959
UK MPs 1959–1964
UK MPs 1964–1966
UK MPs 1966–1970
UK MPs who were granted peerages
British anti-war activists
British conscientious objectors
British Secretaries of State
Chairs of the Labour Party (UK)
English Christian pacifists
Nobel Peace Prize laureates
British Nobel laureates
English Nobel laureates
Members of the Privy Council of the United Kingdom
Presidents of the Cambridge Union
People educated at Bootham School
Alumni of King's College, Cambridge
Fellows of King's College, Cambridge
Academics of the London School of Economics
Haverford College alumni
People associated with the Friends' Ambulance Unit
Sportspeople from Yorkshire
Medalists at the 1920 Summer Olympics
Olympic silver medalists in athletics (track and field)
Ministers in the Attlee governments, 1945–1951
Life peers created by Elizabeth II